The 2020 Bengaluru Open was a professional tennis tournament played on hard courts. It was the third edition of the tournament which was part of the 2020 ATP Challenger Tour. It took place in Bangalore, India from 10 to 16 February 2020.

Singles main-draw entrants

Seeds

 1 Rankings are as of 3 February 2020.

Other entrants
The following players received wildcards into the singles main draw:
  S D Prajwal Dev
  Arjun Kadhe
  Niki Kaliyanda Poonacha
  Adil Kalyanpur
  Suraj Prabodh

The following players received entry into the singles main draw as alternates:
  Sebastian Fanselow
  Manish Sureshkumar

The following players received entry from the qualifying draw:
  Anirudh Chandrasekar
  Abhinav Sanjeev Shanmugam

The following player received entry as a lucky loser:
  Rishi Reddy

Champions

Singles

  James Duckworth def.  Benjamin Bonzi 6–4, 6–4.

Doubles

  Purav Raja /  Ramkumar Ramanathan def.  Matthew Ebden /  Leander Paes 6–0, 6–3.

References

2020 ATP Challenger Tour
2020
2020 in Indian tennis
February 2020 sports events in India
2020s in Bangalore